Lynnwood is the name of two places in the State of Virginia in the United States of America:

 Lynnwood, Rockingham County, Virginia 
 Lynnwood, Virginia Beach, Virginia